The Bulgarian Catholic Apostolic Vicariate of Tracia (informally Tracia of the Bulgarians) was the second missionary, pre-diocesan jurisdiction of the Bulgarian Greek Catholic Church sui iuris (Eastern Catholic, Byzantine Rite in Bulgarian language).

As Apostolic Vicariate it was exempt, i.e. directly dependent on the Holy See, and entitled to a titular bishop.

History 
It was established on 7 April 1883 as Bulgarian Catholic Apostolic Vicariate of Tracia alias Hadrianopolis (after its see Adrianople, now Edirne, in Turkish Thrace) on Ottoman Turkish and Bulgarian territory in Thrace split off from the Bulgarian Catholic Apostolic Vicariate of Constantinople.

In 1926 it was suppressed, its territory like that of its sister Bulgarian Catholic Apostolic Vicariate of Macedonia and their mother Constantinople being reassigned to establish the Bulgarian Catholic Apostolic Exarchate of Sofia.

Ordinaries 
Apostolic Vicars of Thrace 
 Michail Petkov (1883.04.10 – death 1921.05.27), Titular Bishop of Hebron (1883.04.12 – 1921.05.27)
 ''Apostolic Administrator Cristoforo Kondoff (1923 – 1924), no other office

See also
Catholic Church in Bulgaria

References

Sources

External links 
 Catholic Hierarchy: Vicariate Apostolic of Tracia (Bulgarian) 
 GCatholic 

1883 establishments in the Ottoman Empire
Tracia
Tracia
Tracia
Eastern Catholic dioceses in Europe
Eastern Catholicism in Turkey
Catholic Church in Turkey